Barikan (also Romanized as Bārīkān) is a village in Kuri Rural District, in the Central District of Jam County, Bushehr Province, Iran. At the 2006 census, its population was 373, in 77 families.

References 

Populated places in Jam County